Andrei Glanzmann (27 March 1907 - 23 June 1988)  was a Romanian international football forward and coach.

Career 
His career in club football was spent in CA Oradea between 1929–1930, is passed in Ripensia Timişoara in 1930 and he is returned in CA Oradea thin 1935 

Glanzmann made thirteen appearances and scored two goals for the Romania national football team. He was selected in the squad for the 1930 FIFA World Cup finals, but did not play.

References

External links

1907 births
1988 deaths
Sportspeople from Prešov
People from the Kingdom of Hungary
Romanian people of German descent
Romanian footballers
Romania international footballers
1930 FIFA World Cup players
Liga I players
FC Ripensia Timișoara players
CA Oradea players
Association football forwards